Amazing is the fourteenth studio album released by Australian musician Marcia Hines, released in April 2014. The album featured a duet with Russell Crowe. It debuted and peaked at number 27 on the ARIA Albums Chart.

It is her first album of original songs in two decades, with Hines crediting a chance meeting with Joni Mitchell in Los Angeles for this: "She played me her playlist of all the songs she would really dig if she was stranded on a desert island and told me I had to get mine together. I told her my ideas about what I wanted to do next and she told me to follow them."

Hines returned to the R&B sound that saw her reach No. 2 on the Australian charts in 1977 with her single "You".

A deluxe version of the album was released in April 2018, featuring six of Hines' biggest hits.

Promotion
Hines did an in store appearance on 19 April at the WOW Music store in Sydney 

Four promotional video clips were released; "Amazing", "Remedy", "Let Love Flow" and "Chase the Feeling".

Critical reception
The Daily Telegraph wrote that on the album Hines "brings sexy back", while The Canberra Times called it "an uncompromising album, full of deep, heartfelt moments, where her royal Hines-ness shows a very intimate and tender side".

Track listing
Adapted from AllMusic.

Charts

Tour
Hines supported the album with a national tour.

Release history

References

2014 albums
Marcia Hines albums